Matiur Rahman (–7 August 2014) is a Jatiya Party (Ershad) politician and the former Member of Parliament of Gazipur-1.

Career
Rahman was elected to parliament from Gazipur-1 as a Jatiya Party candidate in 1986 and 1988.

Death 
Matiur Rahman died on 7 August 2014.

References 

Jatiya Party politicians
3rd Jatiya Sangsad members
4th Jatiya Sangsad members
1920s births
Year of birth uncertain
2014 deaths